Nathaniel Smith (January 6, 1762 – March 9, 1822) was a nineteenth-century lawyer, cattle dealer, judge and politician. He served as a U.S. Representative from Connecticut and as a judge of the Supreme Court of Connecticut.

Biography 
Smith was born in Woodbury in the Connecticut Colony, the son of Richard Smith and Annis (Hurd) Smith. He attended the common schools and engaged in agricultural pursuits. He was also a cattle dealer. Smith attended the Litchfield Law School. He studied law and was admitted to the bar in 1787. Smith began the practice of law in Woodbury.

In 1789 Smith became a member of the Connecticut House of Representatives, and served in the State House until 1795. He was elected as a Federalist candidate to the Fourth and Fifth Congresses, serving from March 4, 1795 to March 3, 1799. He declined to be a candidate for renomination in 1798.

Smith served as a member of the Connecticut council of assistants from 1799 to 1804. He served in the Connecticut Senate from 1800 to 1805. Smith was State's Attorney for Litchfield County in 1805.

In 1806 he became judge of the Supreme Court of Connecticut. He kept this position for thirteen years. He was also a delegate to the Hartford Convention from 1814 to 1815. Smith died in Woodbury on March 9, 1822. He is interred in the Episcopal Church Cemetery.

Personal life
Smith married Ruth Benedict Smith. They had two children, Harriet J. Smith and Nathaniel Benedict Smith.

Smith was the brother of Nathan Smith, United States Senator from Connecticut, and the uncle of Truman Smith, United States Senator from Connecticut.

References

External links 
 
 Govtrack.us: Rep. Nathaniel Smith
 The Political Graveyard: Smith family of Connecticut
 Litchfield Historical Society: Nathaniel Smith
 Biographical Directory of the United States Congress: SMITH, Nathaniel, (1762 - 1822)

1762 births
1822 deaths
Members of the Connecticut General Assembly Council of Assistants (1662–1818)
Members of the Connecticut House of Representatives
Justices of the Connecticut Supreme Court
People from Woodbury, Connecticut
Federalist Party members of the United States House of Representatives from Connecticut
19th-century American Episcopalians